The 2019 South Dakota Coyotes football team represented the University of South Dakota in the 2019 NCAA Division I FCS football season. They were led by fourth-year head coach Bob Nielson and played their home games in the DakotaDome. They were a member of the Missouri Valley Football Conference. They finished the season 5–7, 4–4 in MVFC play to finish in sixth place.

Previous season

The Coyotes finished the 2018 season 4–7, 3–5 in MVFC play to finish in a three-way tie for sixth place.

Preseason

MVFC poll
In the MVFC preseason poll released on July 29, 2019, the Coyotes were predicted to finish in sixth place.

Preseason All–MVFC team
The Coyotes had two players selected to the preseason all-MVFC team.

Offense

Darakai Allen – WR

Defense

Darin Greenfield – DL

Schedule

Game summaries

Montana

at Oklahoma

Houston Baptist

at Northern Colorado

Indiana State

at Missouri State

at Northern Iowa

Southern Illinois

at Western Illinois

Youngstown State

at North Dakota State

South Dakota State

Ranking movements

References

South Dakota
South Dakota Coyotes football seasons
South Dakota Coyotes football